Hanada (written:  lit. "flower field") is a Japanese surname. Notable people with the surname include:

, Japanese voice actor
, Japanese screenwriter
, Japanese literary critic and writer
, Japanese Nordic combined skier
, Japanese Paralympic swimmer
Takanohana Kenshi born Mitsuru Hanada (1950–2005), a Japanese sumo wrestler 
Takanohana Kōji born Kōji Hanada (花田 光司), a Japanese sumo wrestler, son of Takanohana Kenshi
Wakanohana Masaru born Masaru Hanada (花田 勝), a Japanese sumo wrestler, son of Takanohana Kenshi

Other
Heike Hanada (born 1964), German architect

Japanese-language surnames